Glabella tyermani is a species of sea snail, a marine gastropod mollusk in the family Marginellidae, the margin snails.

Description
The shell size varies between 4.5 mm and 16 mm

Distribution
This species is distributed in the Atlantic Ocean along Gabon and Liberia.
 Island of Banié
 Komo estuary
 Port Gentil, Gabon

References

 Bernard, P.A. (Ed.) (1984). Coquillages du Gabon [Shells of Gabon]. Pierre A. Bernard: Libreville, Gabon. 140, 75 plates
 Gofas S. & Fernandes F. 1988. The marginellids of São Tomé, West Africa. Journal of Conchology 33(1): 1–30, pls. 1–2. page(s): 11–12, pl. 1B
 Cossignani T. (2006). Marginellidae & Cystiscidae of the World. L'Informatore Piceno. 408pp

External links
 

Marginellidae
Gastropods described in 1876